Robert Charlebois, OC, OQ (born June 25, 1944) is a Québecois author, composer, musician, performer and actor.

Charlebois was born in Montreal, Quebec. Among his best known songs are Lindberg (the duo with Louise Forestier in particular), Ordinaire, Les Ailes d'un Ange and Je reviendrai à Montréal. His lyrics, often written in joual, are funny, relying upon plays on words. He won the Sopot International Song Festival in 1970.

In 1970 he sang with Italian singer Patty Pravo the Italian song La solitudine. In the same year, he performed at the Festival Express train tour in Canada, but did not appear on the documentary film.

In 1968, he had an acting role in Jean Pierre Lefebvre's film Straight to the Heart (Jusqu'au cœur). He co-starred with Terence Hill, Miou-Miou and Patrick McGoohan in the western Un genio, due compari, un pollo (A Genius, Two Partners and a Dupe, 1975) as Steamengine Bill. Thirty-eight years later, Charlebois had a cameo as Jean-Seb Bigstone, the French-Canadian Broadway producer, in the 2012 Gad Elmaleh/Sophie Marceau film Happiness Never Comes Alone.

The Quebec-based microbrewery Unibroue was owned, in part, by Charlebois until it was purchased by Sleeman Breweries in 2004 which in turn was bought by Japanese beer brewing giant Sapporo in 2006.

Honours
In 1994, Charlebois received a Governor General's Performing Arts Award for Lifetime Artistic Achievement for his contribution to music in Canada.
In 1999, he was appointed an Officer of the Order of Canada. In 2008, he was made an Officer of the National Order of Quebec.
Charlebois was one of the four musicians who were pictured on the second series of the Canadian Recording Artist Series issued by Canada Post stamps on July 2, 2009.
On June 21, 2010, Charlebois received an honorary doctorate from Concordia University in Montreal. In his acceptance speech he made the remark that this was the first post-secondary diploma he had received in his life.

Music in films
Between Salt and Sweet Water (Entre la mer et l'eau douce) (1967) by Michel Brault, with Geneviève Bujold, Claude Gauthier
Je T'aimerai Toujours (1969; TV Movie)
Two Women in Gold (Deux Femmes en or) (1970) by Claude Fournier, with Monique Mercure, Louise Turcot
A Genius, Two Partners and a Dupe (1975) by Damiano Damiani, with Terence Hill, Patrick McGoohan
L'Agression (1975) by Gérard Pirès, with Jean-Louis Trintignant, Catherine Deneuve
 (1983) by Charles Nemes, with Thierry Lhermitte, Barbara Nielsen
 (1986) by Michel Drach, with Carole Laure, Jeanne Moreau
C.R.A.Z.Y. (2004) by Jean-Marc Vallée, with Michel Côté and Marc-André Grondin
Gabrielle (2013) by Louise Archambault, with Mélissa Désormeaux-Poulin and Alexandre Landry

Brief album discography

 1965 – Volume 1
 1966 – Volume 2
 1967 – Demain l'hiver...
 1968 – Robert Charlebois avec Louise Forestier
 1969 – Québec Love
 1971 – Un gars ben ordinaire
 1971 – Le Mont Athos
 1972 – Fu Man Chu
 1973 – Solidaritude
 1974 – Je rêve à Rio
 1976 – Longue Distance
 1977 – Swing Charlebois Swing (featuring guitar by Frank Zappa on Petroleum) 
 1979 – Solide
 1981 – Heureux en amour?
 1983 – J't'aime comme un fou
 1985 – Super Position
 1988 – Dense
 1992 – Immensément
 1996 – Le Chanteur masqué
 2001 – Doux Sauvage
 2010 – Tout est bien

References

External links
  http://www.robertcharlebois.com
 

1944 births
Canadian rock singers
Canadian singer-songwriters
French Quebecers
French-language singers of Canada
Living people
Officers of the National Order of Quebec
Officers of the Order of Canada
Governor General's Performing Arts Award winners
Musicians from Montreal
Sopot International Song Festival winners
Félix Award winners
20th-century Canadian male singers
21st-century Canadian male singers